These are the official results of the 2003 Central American and Caribbean Championships in Athletics which took place on July 4–6, 2003 in St. George's, Grenada.

Men's results

100 meters

Heats – July 4Wind:Heat 1: +0.6 m/s, Heat 2: +1.1 m/s, Heat 3: +0.8 m/s, Heat 4: +0.5 m/s, Heat 5: +0.8 m/s

Semifinals – July 4Wind:Heat 1: +2.6 m/s, Heat 2: +0.4 m/s, Heat 3: +3.0 m/s

Final – July 4Wind: +0.6 m/s

200 meters

Heats – July 5Wind:Heat 1: +2.7 m/s, Heat 2: +3.3 m/s, Heat 3: +0.8 m/s

Final – July 6Wind:0.0 m/s

400 meters

Heats – July 4

Final – July 5

800 meters

Heats – July 4

Final – July 5

1500 meters
July 6

5000 meters
Non-championship event – July 4

10,000 meters
July 5

Half marathon
July 6

110 meters hurdles
Non-championship event – July 5Wind:+0.5 m/s

400 meters hurdles

Heats – July 4

Final – July 5

3000 meters steeplechase
Non-championship event – July 5

4 x 100 meters relay
Heats – July 5

Final – July 5

4 x 400 meters relay
July 6

18,000 meters walk
Non-championship event – July 4

High jump
July 6

Pole vault
Non-championship event – July 6

Long jump
Qualification – July 5

Final – July 6

Triple jump
July 6

Shot put
July 5

Discus throw
July 4

Hammer throw
Non-championship event – July 5

Javelin throw
July 4

Decathlon
July 4–5

Women's results

100 meters

Heats – July 4Wind:Heat 1: +0.7 m/s, Heat 2: +0.6 m/s, Heat 3: +0.8 m/s

Final – July 4Wind:+0.6 m/s

200 meters

Heats – July 5Wind:Heat 1: +4.5 m/s, Heat 2: +3.9 m/s, Heat 3: +0.5 m/s

Final – July 6Wind:+0.2 m/s

400 meters

Heats

Final

800 meters
July 5

1500 meters
Non-championship event – July 6

10,000 meters
Non-championship event – July 4

Half marathon
Non-championship event – July 6

100 meters hurdles
July 5

400 meters hurdles
July 5

4 x 100 meters relay
July 5

4 x 400 meters relay
July 6

10,000 meters walk
Non-championship event – July 5

High jump
July 4

Pole vault
Non-championship event – July 4

Long jump
July 5

Triple jump
July 4

Shot put
July 6

Discus throw
July 4

Hammer throw
Non-championship event – July 4

Javelin throw
July 6

References
Men's results
Women's results
Combined results
Full results

Central American and Caribbean Championships
Events at the Central American and Caribbean Championships in Athletics